Sunderland Association Football Club was founded in 1879, and turned professional in 1886. This list contains all players that have played 100 or more first-class matches for the club. However, some players who have played fewer matches are also included. This includes players who have set a club playing record, such as goalscoring or transfer fee records.

Jimmy Montgomery holds the record for Sunderland appearances, having played 627 matches between 1960 and 1977, followed by Len Ashurst who made 459 appearances. As of 21 March 2009, the player who has won most international caps while at the club is Charlie Hurley with 36 for Republic of Ireland. Alf Common became the first transfer to reach £1,000 after moving to Middlesbrough from Sunderland in 1905.

The goalscoring record is held by Bobby Gurney, with 227 goals in all competitions, in 390 appearances, scored between 1925 and 1950. Charlie Buchan is the next highest goalscorer, closely behind Gurney with 221 goals, in 411 games, from 1911 to 1925. Dave Halliday holds the record for the most goals scored in a season, set in 1928–29, with 43 league goals in 42 games in the First Division. Halliday also holds a high goalscoring ratio while at Sunderland, scoring 175 goals in 164 games, with a goal every 0.94 games. Defender Charlie Hurley was voted as Sunderland's "Player of the Century" in the club's centenary season in 1979.

Players
Players are listed according to the date of their first-team debut for the club. Appearances and goals are for first-team competitive matches only; wartime matches are excluded. Substitute appearances are included.

Players with name in bold are Sunderland record holders.
Players with nationality in bold won full international caps for their country while with the club.

Statistics are correct as of 19 October 2018

Footnotes

A. : Club's most capped player with 36 appearances for Republic of Ireland.
B. : First player to be transferred for £1000.
C. : All-time top scorer.
D. : Most goals in a season (43) in 1928–29 season.
E. : Named Sunderland's player of the century.
F. : For a full description of positions see football positions.
G. : The Date from column includes data of the year the player made his debut for the club, also including data of multiple spells at the club by a player.
H. : The Date to column includes data of the year the player made his last appearances for the club.
I. : All entries in this column are sourced to the player's individual page from The Stat Cat or Soccerbase.
J. : Club's first professional captain.
K. : Most capped player for England of those playing for both Sunderland and the national side simultaneously.
L. : Top goalscorer for England of those playing for both Sunderland and the national side simultaneously.
M. : Represented England at both cricket and football.
N. : Only player to have captained Sunderland, Newcastle United and Middlesbrough.
O. : All-time appearance record-holder
P. : Captained 1973 FA Cup winning team.
Q. : Scored 1973 FA Cup winning goal.
R. : Served as Chairman-Manager before appointment of Roy Keane as manager in 2006–07 season.
S. : Post-war leading goalscorer.
T. : Club record transfer sale, £18,000,000, to Aston Villa.
U. : Club record transfer purchase, £13,600,000, from Lorient.
V. : First non-British born player to represent SAFC at Wembley stadium as-well as the first German to play for the club.

References

General
 
Specific

External links
 Player statistics at Soccerbase

Sunderland
Players
 
Association football player non-biographical articles